Isaac Leet (1801June 10, 1844) was an American politician from Pennsylvania who served as a Democratic member of the U.S. House of Representatives for Pennsylvania's 21st congressional district from 1839 to 1841.

Biography
Isaac Leet was born near Washington, Pennsylvania.  He graduated from Washington College (now Washington & Jefferson College) in Washington, Pennsylvania, in 1822.  He studied law under Thomas McKean Thompson McKennan was admitted to the bar in 1826 and commenced practice in Washington, Pennsylvania.  He served as treasurer of Washington County, Pennsylvania, from 1826 to 1830.  He was deputy attorney general of Washington County from 1830 to 1834, and was a member of the Pennsylvania State Senate for the 20th district from 1833 to 1836 and the 17th district from 1837 to 1838.

Leet was elected as a Democrat to the Twenty-sixth Congress.  He was an unsuccessful candidate for reelection in 1840 to the Twenty-seventh Congress.  He died in Washington in 1844 and is interred in the Cooke Burial Grounds near Washington, Pennsylvania.

Footnotes

Sources

 The Political Graveyard

|-

1801 births
1844 deaths
19th-century American politicians
Burials in Pennsylvania
Democratic Party members of the United States House of Representatives from Pennsylvania
Pennsylvania lawyers
Democratic Party Pennsylvania state senators
People from Washington, Pennsylvania
Washington & Jefferson College alumni
19th-century American lawyers